The Denyen (Egyptian: dꜣjnjnjw) is purported to be one of the groups constituting the Sea Peoples.

Origin
They are mentioned in the Amarna letters from the 14th century BC as possibly being related to the "Land of the Danuna" near Ugarit.

The Egyptians described them as Sea Peoples.

Hittite Empire
The Denyen have been identified with the people of Adana, in Cilicia who existed in late Hittite Empire times. They are also believed to have settled in Cyprus. A Hittite report speaks of a Muksus, who also appears in an eighth-century bilingual inscription from Karatepe bilingual stele in Cilicia, which also mentions the king of the "Danunians" (Phoenician: 𐤃𐤍𐤍𐤉𐤌 dnnym). A newly published early Luwian inscription from the notes of James Mellaart also mentions Muksus, but it turned out that this and other texts Mellaart owned were almost certainly forgeries. The kings of Adana are traced from the "house of Mopsos," given in hieroglyphic Luwian as Moxos and in Phoenician as Mopsos, in the form mps. They were called the Dananiyim. The area also reports a Mopsukrene ("Mopsus' fountain" in Greek) and a Mopsuhestia ("Mopsus' hearth" in Greek), also in Cilicia.

Egyptian raids and settlement
They were raiders associated with the Eastern Mediterranean Dark Ages who attacked Egypt in 1207 BC in alliance with the Libyans and other Sea Peoples, as well as during the reign of Rameses III. The 20th Egyptian Dynasty allowed them to settle in Canaan, which was largely controlled by the Sea Peoples into the 11th century BC.

Aegean Sea
These areas also show evidence of close ties with the Aegean as a result of the Late Helladic IIIC 1b pottery found in these areas. Some scholars argue for a connection with the Greek Danaoi (Δαναοί)—alternate names for the Achaeans familiar from Homer. Greek mythology refers to Danaos who with his daughters, the Danaïdes, came from Egypt and settled in Argos. Through Danaë's son, Perseus, the Danaans are said to have built Mycenae.

Tribe of Dan

There are suggestions that the Denyen joined with Hebrews to form one of the original Twelve Tribes of Israel.

A minority view first suggested by Yigael Yadin attempted to connect the Denyen with the Tribe of Dan, described as remaining on their ships in the early Song of Deborah, contrary to the mainstream view of Israelite history. It was speculated that the Denyen had been taken to Egypt, and subsequently settled between the Caphtorite Philistines and the Tjekker, along the Mediterranean coast with the Tribe of Dan subsequently deriving from them. This theory has not been accepted, however.

The most famous Danite was Samson, who some suggest is derived from Denyen tribal legends.

References

 
Ancient peoples
History of Adana
Iron Age Greece
Mycenaean Greece
Sea Peoples